is a former Japanese football player.

Playing career
Yokoyama was born in Hirao, Yamaguchi on February 14, 1980. After dropped out from Waseda University, he joined J2 League club Omiya Ardija in 2001. He debuted in May 2001 and play many matches as forward from summer. Although he could not become a regular, he played many matches every seasons. Ardija won the 2nd place in 2004 season and was promoted to J1 League first time in the club history. After playing in J1 in 2005 season, he moved to J2 club Shonan Bellmare in 2006. He became a regular player and scored 8 goals. In 2007, he moved to Japan Football League (JFL) club Tochigi SC. He played as regular forward and Tochigi was promoted to J2 end of 2008 season. However he left the club end of 2008 season without playing J2. In 2009, he moved to JFL club TDK (later Blaublitz Akita). He played for the club in 2 seasons and retired end of 2010 season.

Club statistics

References

External links

1980 births
Living people
Waseda University alumni
Association football people from Yamaguchi Prefecture
Japanese footballers
J1 League players
J2 League players
Japan Football League players
Omiya Ardija players
Shonan Bellmare players
Tochigi SC players
Blaublitz Akita players
Association football forwards